Ingegerdsleden ("the Ingegerd trail") is a pilgrimage route in the province of Uppland in Sweden, between Stockholm Cathedral (Storkyrkan) and Uppsala Cathedral (Uppsala domkyrka). The hiking trail is approximately 110 kilometres (68 mi) and passes historical places, churches, palaces and nature reserves.

The trail is named after the Swedish princess Ingegerd Olofsdotter, daughter of Swedish king Olof Skötkonung and who after she married became Grand princess of Kiev.  
After her death Ingegerd was later declared a saint by the name of St. Anna in Novgorod.

Route

The Ingegerd trail is divided into seven separate walks:

 Stockholm Cathedral – Ulriksdal - Kista Church 22 km
 Kista Church - Ed Church 16 km
 Ed Church - Rosersberg Palace 14 km
 Rosersberg Palace - Sigtuna 13 km
 Sigtuna - Odensala Church 14 km
 Odensala Church - Alsike Church 14 km
 Alsike Church - Sunnersta Church - Uppsala Cathedral 18 km

In addition to these, there are alternative stretches for easy access to, for example, public transport.

See also
 Ingegerd Olofsdotter of Sweden
 Church of Sweden

References

Notes

Sources

Maps and GPX-tracks
 Ingegerdsleden Walk 1: Storkyrkan - Ulriksdal - Kista
 Ingegerdsleden Walk 2: Kista kyrka - Eds kyrka
 Ingegerdsleden Walk 3: Eds kyrka - Rosersbergs slott
 Ingegerdsleden Walk 4: Rosersbergs slott - Sigtuna
 Ingegerdsleden Walk 5: Sigtuna - Odensala
 Ingegerdsleden Walk 6: Odensala - Alsike kyrka
 Ingegerdsleden Walk 7: Alsike - Sunnersta - Uppsala

External links
 The Church of Sweden's information about Ingegerdsleden (Swedish)
 Map over Ingegerdsleden (Swedish)

Hiking trails in Sweden
Uppland